Sibpur (also spelled Shibpur) is a village in Kanksa CD block  in the Durgapur subdivision of the Paschim Bardhaman district in the Indian state of West Bengal.

Geography

Urbanisation
According to the 2011 census, 79.22% of the population of the Durgapur subdivision was urban and 20.78% was rural. The Durgapur subdivision has 1 municipal corporation at Durgapur and 38 (+1 partly) census towns (partly presented in the map alongside; all places marked on the map are linked in the full-screen map).

Location

Demographics
According to the 2011 Census of India, Sibpur had a toal population of 1953 of which 999 (51%) were males and 954 (49%) were females. Population in the age range 0–6 years was 109. The total number of literate persons in Sibpur was 1,844 (71.26% of the population over 6 years).

*For language details see Kanksa (community development block)#Language and religion

Transport
A new bridge is proposed to be built across the Ajay River near Sibpur, connecting this area to Jaydev Kenduli. At present a fair-weather bridge is laid across the river in the dry season.

Education
Shibpur Junior High School is a Bengali-medium coeducational institution established in 2010. It has facilities for teaching from class V to class VIII.

Jamdaha High School is a Bengali-medium coeducational institution established in 1982. It has facilities for teaching from class V to class XII. The school has a library with 307books and a playground.

Healthcare
There is a primary health centre, with 6 beds, at Shibpur.

References

Villages in Paschim Bardhaman district